The Embassy of the Kingdom of Saudi Arabia in Moscow is the diplomatic mission of Saudi Arabia in the Russian Federation. It is located at 3 Neopalimovsky Lane Street in the Khamovniki District of Moscow.

See also 
 Russia–Saudi Arabia relations
 Diplomatic missions in Russia

References

External links 
  Embassy of Saudi Arabia in Moscow
  Royal Embassy of Saudi Arabia in Moscow (Archive)

Russia–Saudi Arabia relations
Saudi Arabia
Moscow
Khamovniki District